Earthquakes have occurred in Western Australia (WA) on a regular basis throughout its geological history.

In 1849, the first earthquake following European settlement in WA was recorded. "On Saturday last, about a quarter past four o'clock a.m., several inhabitants of Perth were awoke by what they conceived to be a slight shock of an earthquake."

The largest earthquake affecting Western Australia in modern times was an offshore earthquake in 2019, occurring 202 km west of Broome at a magnitude of 6.6 causing minor damage in the town itself. The strongest earthquake with its epicentre on land is the magnitude 6.5 Meckering earthquake of 1968, which caused injuries to at least 17 people and extensive property damage; it was the best-known earthquake in Western Australia the late twentieth century. The previous largest earthquake documented occurred in 1941, at Meeberrie, in the Murchison region. Like many earthquakes it remained little known, due to its lack of impact on urban areas. Initially reported at magnitude 7.2 – 7.3 it was eventually revised down to 6.3 in by Geoscience Australia in 2016. The Meckering quake was also revised down from 6.9 to 6.5 in the same year but in the process overtook the Meeberrie quake in strength.

Recording
Prior to scientific equipment being utilised to record earthquakes, newspaper reports appear to be the main source of historical information. Perth Observatory was the recording location from 1923 to 1959, when the Mundaring Geophysical Observatory was operated by the Bureau of Mineral Resources between March 1959 and April 2000. Subsequent to the closing of the Mundaring observatory, recording locations are more dispersed throughout the state.

Significant earthquakes

Western Australia's largest recorded onshore earthquake to date was at the Wheatbelt township of Meckering, in October 1968. See the separate section below.

The Meckering, Calingiri (several during 1970 and 1971) and Cadoux earthquakes led to the identification of a zone of seismicity known as the South West Seismic Zone. This zone has now been significantly mapped and analysed and is the most active zone in Western Australia.

Exmouth 1906 
The earthquake which occurred in 1906 about  NW of Exmouth occurred before world earthquake monitoring had really developed. With an estimated magnitude of 7.5, it is probably the largest earthquake known to have occurred in the Australian region.

Kalgoorlie 1917 
On 28 August 1917, tremor was reported near midnight in Kalgoorlie, which resulted in an underground rock fall, killing one miner and injuring several others. Also in the 1990s further seismic activity required consideration of seismic activity.

Meeberrie Station 1941
The second largest onshore earthquake to date in Western Australia was on 29 April 1941 at Meeberrie station at 01.35.39 am (Lat −26.90 and Long 115.80). It was initially reported with a magnitude of 7.3 (though some sources give 7.2) but was revised to 6.3 in 2016.

Yallingup 1946
On 20 April 1946 a magnitude 5.7 earthquake occurred near Yallingup at 9:13pm on 19 April 1946 (5:13 local time on 20 April), which was felt at Kirup. A tremor was reported at 5:30am at Caves House Yallingup and at Busselton on 30 April, which is probably the same event, reported on the wrong date.

Gabalong 1955
The earthquake, at 9:52pm local time, was felt at MM VI at Yericoin and Miling, and MM V in Moora. It was felt in Perth at intensities between MM II and MM IV, and at Dongara at MM II.
It was preceded by a magnitude 5.3 earthquake at the same location at 2:09pm on the same day. It was a SouthWest Seismic Zone earthquake, and because of the poor location capabilities at the time, may well be related to a series of earthquakes near Yericoin, which started with a magnitude 5.1 earthquake on 2 May 1949.

Busselton 1959
A magnitude 5.0 earthquake occurred at 12:07 GMT on 3 October (8:07pm local time) at 34.5 degrees south, 114.5 degrees east. It was felt at Busselton, Yallingup, Margaret River, Bunbury, Cape Naturaliste and Cape Leeuwin.

Near Brookton 1963
18 January 1963 at Nourning Spring, approximately  NE of Brookton and approximately  ESE of Perth. It was felt at Intensity VII at Nourning Springs, VI at Brookton, and MM II at Perth. It occurred at 1:49pm local time, and had a magnitude of 5.4, although it was given a magnitude of 4.9 originally. Many earthquake questionnaires were distributed for this event, and a good isoseismal map was prepared.

Meckering 1968

This intraplate earthquake is thought to be caused through east–west compressional force within the southwest seismic zone.

Lake Tobin 1970
24 March 1970, magnitude 6.7 near Lake Tobin in the Canning Basin, was the first in a location which had many more earthquakes over the following years. In all, there were three earthquakes of magnitude 6.0 or more (24 March 1970, M 6.7, 16 July 1971, M6.4 and 3/10/75, M 6.2), and 25 earthquakes of magnitude 5.0 or more, the last of which occurred on 13 February 1982.

Calingiri 1970 & 1971
An earthquake struck the Wheatbelt town of Calingiri on 10 March 1970
with a magnitude of 5.9.

Cadoux 1979
On 2 June 1979 the second-most damaging earthquake in Western Australia's recorded history hit with a magnitude of 6.1. The total amount of damage was around A$3.8 million.

Collier Bay 1997
This earthquake, 10 Aug 1997, magnitude 6.3 just off the WA north coast in Collier Bay, was the largest Australian earthquake since the magnitude 6.7 earthquake near Tennant Creek, in the Northern Territory, in January 1988.

Burakin swarm 2000–01
Located near Cadoux (but not on the same physical feature) the Burakin event was named the most significant seismic activity in 40 years.

South of Albany 2001
It was felt in Albany.

Kalgoorlie 2010
On 20 April 2010, a magnitude 5.0 earthquake occurred close to Kalgoorlie. The quake caused damage to a number of hotels along Burt street in Boulder and an underpass also on Burt street collapsed. Work in the Superpit and many other mines around Kalgoorlie was also stopped.

Lake Muir 2018
On 16 September 2018 a magnitude 5.7 earthquake occurred with its epicentre close to Lake Muir in the South West region. On 13 October another earthquake with a magnitude of 4.7 was recorded followed by a magnitude 5.4 earthquake on 9 November.

West of Broome 2019
A magnitude 6.6 earthquake struck just over 200 km west-southwest of Broome during the afternoon of the 14 July 2019 at a depth of 10 km. While it is tied for largest earthquake in Australian waters and was felt widely across northern Western Australia the isolation of the quake meant only superficial damage was reported in Broome

Marble Bar 2021
On 13 November 2021 a magnitude 5.4 earthquake stuck east of Marble Bar in the evening. The earthquake was 7.3 km deep and was widely felt across the Eastern Pilbara including in Newman, Port Hedland and various mining projects in the area.

Arthur River swarm 2022
The region between Darkan and Wagin, centred on the hamlet of Arthur River has reported over 40 earthquakes since the first event on the 5 January 2022, with the strongest so far a magnitude 4.7 on the 25 January. It was reported as far away as Busselton and Albany with minor damage reported in Wagin.

Southwest region earthquakes

See also
 List of earthquakes in Australia

Notes

 
Geology of Western Australia